"Leyendas" (Spanish for "Legends") is a song by Colombian singer Karol G, Puerto Rican singers Wisin & Yandel and American singer Nicky Jam featuring Puerto Rican reggaeton artists Ivy Queen, Zion and Alberto Stylee. The song was released on March 25, 2021 through Universal Music Latino and was featured on Karol G's third studio album KG0516.

Background 

The song was first revealed through Karol G's album track list announcement for her third studio album KG0516 on March 22, 2021. The song was released on March 25, 2021 with the release of the album.

On an exclusive interview with MoluscoTV Karol G explained why she wanted to make the song: "The most beautiful thing for me in making "Leyendas" was that I called all the artists and told them the idea of the song. That this genre has grown and evolved because I feel everyone collaborates with everyone, from the biggest artist to the smallest ones and new ones, and that has made the genre evolve. I choose my favorite classics, called the artists and asked them. No one told me 'no', there were no egos, and you know what? That makes them more of a legends, because from them, is that we the new ones learn to let go of fights we might have with each other, from those big artists."

In the same interview, Giraldo also revealed how Chencho from  Plan B was supposed to appear on the track, but due to problems with his label, was denied permission: "Hopefully one day you’ll guys will get to hear the verse he made. For me that was the worse feeling, that he didn’t make it into the final cut, he deserved it because of how fire his verse was."

Composition 

"Leyendas" interpolates "Quiero Bailar" from Ivy Queen, "Me Pones en Tension" from Zion & Lennox, "En La Disco Bailoteo" from Wisin & Yandel, "Yo No Soy Tu Marido" by Nicky Jam, and "Vengo Acabando" by Wisin & Yandel, Alberto Stylee and Franco El Gorila.

Critical reception 

Billboard called the song an essential track to the album, stating "The Colombian artist reeled in some of the biggest pioneers in reggaetón’s history, paying a nearly six-minute tribute to the genre’s earlier years. You’d think that the closing track would wrap up Karol’s new album nicely — but this only marks the beginning for the rising star."

Chart performance

Certifications

References

2021 songs
Karol G songs
Ivy Queen songs
Wisin & Yandel songs
Spanish-language songs
Songs written by Ivy Queen
Songs written by Wisin
Songs written by Yandel
Songs written by Nicky Jam
Songs written by Tainy
Songs written by Rafael Pina
Songs written by Annie Lennox